Psalm 64 is the 64th psalm of the Book of Psalms, beginning in English in the King James Version: "Hear my voice, O God, in my prayer: preserve my life from fear of the enemy". In the slightly different numbering system of the Greek Septuagint version of the Bible and the Latin Vulgate, this psalm is Psalm 63. In Latin, it is known as "Exaudi Deus orationem meam". It is directed against the "wicked" (רעע) and "workers of iniquity" (פֹּעֲלֵי אָֽוֶן), whom God shall shoot with an arrow (וַיֹּרֵם אֱלֹהִים חֵץ). The psalm may be treated as a prayer for deliverance from enemies, or as a thanksgiving, or a testimony to divine judgement.

The psalm forms a regular part of Jewish, Catholic, Lutheran, Anglican and other Protestant liturgies. It has been set to music.

Text

Hebrew Bible version 
The following is the Hebrew text of Psalm 64:

King James Version 
 Hear my voice, O God, in my prayer: preserve my life from fear of the enemy.
 Hide me from the secret counsel of the wicked; from the insurrection of the workers of iniquity:
 Who whet their tongue like a sword, and bend their bows to shoot their arrows, even bitter words:
 That they may shoot in secret at the perfect: suddenly do they shoot at him, and fear not.
 They encourage themselves in an evil matter: they commune of laying snares privily; they say, Who shall see them?
 They search out iniquities; they accomplish a diligent search: both the inward thought of every one of them, and the heart, is deep.
 But God shall shoot at them with an arrow; suddenly shall they be wounded.
 So they shall make their own tongue to fall upon themselves: all that see them shall flee away.
 And all men shall fear, and shall declare the work of God; for they shall wisely consider of his doing.
 The righteous shall be glad in the LORD, and shall trust in him; and all the upright in heart shall glory.

Content 
Verses 6–7 (Vulgate: Psalm 63:7-8) have been the subject of confusion in early Bible translations: the King James Version translates the Hebrew as:
"They search out iniquities; they accomplish a diligent search: both the inward thought of every one of them, and the heart, is deep. But God shall shoot at them with an arrow; suddenly shall they be wounded."

But in the Vulgate, Jerome, based on the Septuagint text, rendered this as 
Scrutati sunt iniquitates; defecerunt scrutantes scrutinio. Accedet homo ad cor altum, et exaltabitur Deus. Sagittæ parvulorum factæ sunt plagæ eorum,
which translates to "They have searched after iniquities: they have failed in their search. Man shall accede to a lofty heart: And God shall be exalted. The arrows of children are their wounds."

The adjective altum in Latin has both the meanings "high" and "deep", and it is here used to translate LXX  βαθεῖα "deep", but it offered itself to an interpretation of an "exalted heart". The "arrows of children" (Sagittæ parvulum) render LXX βέλος νηπίων, which has no correspondence in the Hebrew text as it has come down to us.

Jerome's translation gave rise to mystical interpretations involving the Sacred Heart in early modern Christian tradition. For example, Serafino Porrecta, in his Commentaria in Psalterium Davidicum, interprets this in terms of Christ himself being the Man who can "accede to that exalted heart", Hic [Christus] solus accessit ad illum cor altum.

The arrow of God leads to a turning to God. In verse 4 the wicked shoot arrows secretly at the righteous. In verse 7, God shoots an arrow (arrows, plural, in some translations) at the wicked, but for some these will be saving arrows, as in verse 9: men will "proclaim the works of God and ponder what he has done".

Uses

Catholic Church
This psalm was chosen by St. Benedict of Nursia around 530, for the solemn office at the lauds of Wednesday. In the Rule of St. Benedict, it was recited or sung after Psalm 51 (50) and followed by Psalm 65 (64) (chapter XIII). A number of abbeys still retain this tradition dating from the 6th century.

In the current Liturgy of the Hours, Psalm 64 is recited or sung at the midday office on the Saturday of the second week of a four-weekly cycle of liturgical prayers.

Book of Common Prayer 
In the Church of England's Book of Common Prayer, this psalm is appointed to be read on the morning of the 12th day of the month.

Music 
Heinrich Schütz set Psalm 64 in a metred version in German, "Erhör mein Stimm, Herr, wenn ich klag", SWV 161, as part of the Becker Psalter, first published in 1628. Zdeněk Fibich composed a setting, Hud. 155, for mixed choir in 1879.

References

External links 

 
 
  in Hebrew and English - Mechon-mamre
 Text of Psalm 64 according to the 1928 Psalter
 For the leader. A psalm of David. / O God, hear my anguished voice; from a dreadful foe protect my life. text and footnotes, usccb.org United States Conference of Catholic Bishops
 Psalm 64 – Secret Plots and Sudden Shots text and detailed commentary, enduringword.com
 Psalm 64:1 introduction and text, biblestudytools.com
 Psalm 64 / Refrain: The righteous shall rejoice in the Lord. Church of England
 Psalm 64 at biblegateway.com
 Hymns for Psalm 64 hymnary.org
 Blue Letter Bible (Hebrew, LXX and various English translations)
 LXX, Vulgate and Knox Translations (newadvent.org)

064
Works attributed to David